Betty Medsger is an author and investigative reporter. Medsger is the author of several books, including The Burglary: The Discovery of J. Edgar Hoover's Secret FBI. Medsger was instrumental in uncovering the work of COINTELPRO and secret activities by the FBI. She is the former chair of the Department of Journalism and Professor Emerita at San Francisco State University.

See also
 Citizens' Commission to Investigate the FBI
 1971 (2014 film)

References

Living people
American women journalists
Year of birth missing (living people)
American women non-fiction writers
21st-century American journalists
21st-century American non-fiction writers
21st-century American women writers